Climate change in Algeria has wide-reaching effects on the country. Algeria was not a significant contributor to climate change, but, like other countries in the MENA region, is expected to be among the most affected by climate change impacts. Because a large part of the country is in already hot and arid geographies, including part of the Sahara, already strong heat and water resource access challenges are expected to get worse. As early as 2014, scientists were attributing extreme heat waves to climate change in Algeria. Algeria was ranked 46th of countries in the 2020 Climate Change Performance Index.

Greenhouse gas emissions 

Algeria is a low emitter of carbon dioxide: producing 4.1 tons per capita as of 2008, less than the global average at that times. At that time the 74% of their emission came from energy production.

Impacts on the natural environment

Temperature and weather changes

Water resources 

According to World Bank, Algeria qualifies as a water scarce country. Moreover, groundwater is already overexploited.

Impacts on people

Economic impacts

Agriculture 

Agricultural land and water is already under pressure from both human activity, and desertification, erosion, and vegetation loss. Climate change is expected to speed up this process, weakening soil and biodiversity in farmland. Every part of agriculture in the country is expected to be affected: for example, small scale shepherding which is a common form of agriculture, becomes increasingly expensive as herders have to dig wells and buy feed, rather than use grazing.

Mitigation and adaptation

Policies and legislation 
The initial strategy developed by Algeria, as of 2013, focused on four areas: institutional strengthening, adaptation to climate change, mitigation of emissions of GHG and human capacity building.

Algeria followed through on its commitment to the Kyoto Protocol and has ratified the United Nations Framework Convention on Climate Change. However, the 2020 Climate Change Performance Index described their policy approach as not enough to meet the 2° C goal.

References 

Algeria
Environment of Algeria
Algeria